Redwood Memorial Hospital was a community hospital in Rhymney, Wales, managed by the Aneurin Bevan University Health Board. It closed in July 2013, and services are now offered through the Rhymney Integrated Health & Social Care Centre.

History
The hospital was commissioned by the Rhymney Workmen's Medical Aid Fund, which was supported by contributions from workmen, each man donating six pennies in the pound from his wages. Established to combat the high rates of mortality and injury in the area, it opened in 1904. The closure of several pits in the area during the 1920s had a severe effect on the local community.  The hospital was renamed in honour of Dr de Action Redwood, who was the surgeon there for 43 years, in 1947. It closed in July 2013, and services are now offered through the Rhymney Integrated Health & Social Care Centre.

References

Hospital buildings completed in 1904
Hospitals in Caerphilly County Borough
Hospitals established in 1904
NHS hospitals in Wales